Tirich Mir til topps (To the Top of Tirich Mir) is a Norwegian documentary film directed by Rasmus Breistein. It describes an expedition to the  peak Tirich Mir in the Hindu Kush in 1950. The summit was reached on July 23, and it was the fourth-highest ascent ever. The expedition, which started from Pakistan, was initiated by Arne Næss. The film premiered on August 25, 1952.

The film was recorded as 16 mm film, and for screening in cinemas it was copied to 35 mm.

References

External links
 
 Tirich Mir til topps at the National Library of Norway
 Tirich Mir til topps at Filmfront

1952 films
Films directed by Rasmus Breistein